= Chakdida =

Village in Uttar Pradesh, India

Chakdida is a village in Prayagraj, Uttar Pradesh, India.
